Sarala is a village in Shrirampur taluka of Ahmednagar district in Indian state of Maharashtra. Village is famous for Samadhi of Sant Gangageer Maharaj.

Location
Sarala is situated north of Shrirampur taluka on the banks of Godavari river. Village shares boundary with Aurangabad district.

Demographics
As per 2011 census, population of Sarala is 1261. Male constitute 657 and female constitute 604.

Economy
Agriculture and allied work are source of income.

References 

Villages in Ahmednagar district